Fran Saleški Finžgar (February 9, 1871 – June 2, 1962) was perhaps the most popular Slovene folk writer. He is particularly known for his novels and short stories, although he also wrote poems and plays.

Life
Fran Saleški Finžgar was born into a poor peasant family in the Upper Carniolan village of Doslovče, in what was then the Austro-Hungarian Empire. After finishing primary education in the town of Radovljica, he attended secondary school in Ljubljana between 1882 and 1891, continuing his education at the theological college. He was ordained priest in 1894 and worked in various parishes in Upper Carniola and Ljubljana until 1936, when he retired.  He died in Ljubljana at the age of 91 and was buried at the Žale cemetery.

Politically, Finžgar was close to the Christian Socialist ideals of the Slovenian Catholic political activist and leader Janez Evangelist Krek. He was also an admirer and friend of the Social Democratic author Ivan Cankar, whom he even catered at his deathbed in 1918. During World War II, he collaborated with the Communist-led Liberation Front of the Slovenian People, which led him to some conflict with the then bishop of Ljubljana, Gregorij Rožman.

The Finžgar House in Doslovče was frequented by many intellectuals from the area, particularly by his best friend Izidor Cankar, an influential art historian and manager. The ethnologist Janez Bogataj, whose mother was Finžgar's niece, spent his first 15 years in Finžgar's company and arranged his birth house for public in 1971. Finžgar's close friend and personal advisor was also the architect Jože Plečnik. When Finžgar served as a priest in the parish of Trnovo in Ljubljana, Plečnik was his neighbour. In the late 1920s, Finžgar commissioned the renovation of the Trnovo parish church to his architect friend.

Work
Finžgar started his literary career as a poet, but later turned to prose. He wrote novels in the Neo-Romantic style, depicting rural and small-town life. He is best known for his patriotic historical novel , written between 1906 and 1907. It was set in the 6th century AD and depicted the conflict between South Slavic tribes and the degenerate Byzantine Empire.

Finžgar also wrote short stories and tales for children, the best known of which is Mr. Squall, a set interlinked humorous adventures of a city-dweller who delights in holidaying in the high Karawanks. In addition, he wrote a number of plays, none of them particularly successful. He translated several works of the Austrian poet Peter Rosegger, whom he admired, into Slovene. He was the editor of the family magazine Mladika (The Shoot) and member of the Slovene Academy of Sciences and Arts.

In 1939, Finžgar participated in the opening of the Prešeren House, the birth house of France Prešeren in Vrba, a village near Doslovče as a museum. In 1940, the Prešeren House and the village were filmed for the black and white sound documentary O, Vrba. The house was presented by Finžgar, whereas Oton Župančič read the poem "O Vrba".

References

External links
 

 
1871 births
1962 deaths
People from the Municipality of Žirovnica
Slovenian dramatists and playwrights
Slovenian novelists
Slovenian translators
German–Slovene translators
Members of the Slovenian Academy of Sciences and Arts
Prešeren Award laureates
20th-century Slovenian Roman Catholic priests
Levstik Award laureates
Slovenian poets
Slovenian male poets
Slovenian male short story writers
Slovenian short story writers
Slovenian children's writers
Slovenian editors
Burials at Žale